Przedwabie  is the part of Szymanowice village, Gmina Sobienie-Jeziory.The population is near 40. From 1975 to 1998 this place was in Siedlce Voivodeship.

Villages in Otwock County